Golovino, town in Tavush Province in Armenia

Golovino may also refer to:

Golovino, Belgorod Oblast, Russia
Golovino, Kirzhachsky District, Vladimir Oblast, Russia
Golovino, Petushinsky District, Vladimir Oblast, Russia
Golovino, Selivanovsky District, Vladimir Oblast, Russia
Golovino, Sobinsky District, Vladimir Oblast, Russia
Golovino, Sudogodsky District, Vladimir Oblast, Russia
Golovino, Vyaznikovsky District, Vladimir Oblast, Russia

See also
Golovin (disambiguation)
Golovinsky (disambiguation)